John Frank Boyd (August 8, 1853 – May 28, 1945) was a Nebraska Republican politician.

Born in Connellsville, Pennsylvania, on August 8, 1853, he moved with his parents to Henry County, Illinois, in 1857. There he attended public schools and Abingdon College (which was later consolidated with Eureka College) where he studied law and was admitted to the bar in 1878. He first set up practice in Galva, Illinois, and then in 1883 Oakdale, Nebraska. He became prosecuting attorney of Antelope County, Nebraska, in 1888 and served until 1894. He moved to Neligh, Nebraska, in 1901.

In 1900 he became judge of the Ninth Judicial District Court of Nebraska and served until 1907 when he was elected as a Republican to the Sixtieth Congress (March 4, 1907 – March 3, 1909) representing the third district. He lost to James P. Latta in the 1908 election, and resumed his practice of law in Neligh. He retired and moved to Los Angeles, California, in 1929. He died there on May 28, 1945, and is buried in Forest Lawn Cemetery, in Glendale, California.

References
 
 
 
 

1853 births
1945 deaths
People from Connellsville, Pennsylvania
Republican Party members of the United States House of Representatives from Nebraska
Nebraska state court judges
People from Galva, Illinois
People from Neligh, Nebraska